Astragalus flavus (yellow milkvetch) is a perennial plant in the legume family (Fabaceae) found in the Colorado Plateau and Canyonlands region of the southwestern United States.

Growth pattern
The plant is covered with star-shaped hairs.

Patches of the plants in bloom may cover large areas of the ground in yellow from the flowers.

Stems and leaves
 leaves are compound pinnate, with linear to egg shaped  leaflets.

Inflorescence and fruit
"Flavus" means "yellow". It blooms from May to June.

Habitat and range

References

flavus
Flora of the Colorado Plateau and Canyonlands region